Sir James Rushout, 1st Baronet (22 March 1644 – 16 February 1698), of Northwick Park, Worcestershire, was an English landowner and politician who sat in the House of Commons between 1670 and 1698.

Rushout was the fifth but only surviving son of John Rushout, Fishmonger, of St Dionis Backchurch, London and Maylords and his first wife, Anne Godschalk, daughter of Joas Godschalk, merchant, of Fenchurch Street, London. He succeeded his father in 1653. He matriculated at Christ Church, Oxford in 1660 and was awarded MA in 1661. He was created a Baronet at the young age of 17 on 17 June 1661.

Rusout was returned as Member of Parliament for Evesham at a by-election on 22 February 1670 and sat until 1685. He bought Northwick Park in 1683 and carried out extensive remodelling of the mansion house in 1686. At the 1689 English general election he was returned as MP for Worcestershire. He returned to Evesham at the 1690 English general election. In April 1697, he was nominated by the king to be ambassador at Constantinople, but died before he could take up the appointment.

Rushout died on 16 February 1698, aged 53.

Family
In 1670, he married Alice Palmer, widow of Edward Palmer  of the Middle Temple and daughter of Edmund Pitt of Sudbury Court, Harrow, Middlesex.

They had five sons and four daughters:
 William Rushout
 Alice Rushout, married Edwin Sandys 
 Catherine Rushout, married Samuel Pytts 
 Sir James Rushout 
 William Rushout
 Jane Rushout
 Elizabeth Rushout, married firstly Sir George Thorold , secondly George Compton, 4th Earl of Northampton
 Sir John Rushout 
 George Rushout

He was succeeded in the baronetcy by his eldest son James, and subsequently by his fourth son John, both of whom in turn inherited Northwick Park.

References 

1644 births
1698 deaths
Baronets in the Baronetage of England
Members of the Parliament of England for Worcestershire
English MPs 1661–1679
English MPs 1679
English MPs 1680–1681
English MPs 1681
English MPs 1689–1690
English MPs 1690–1695
English MPs 1695–1698